KPC Medical College and Hospital is a private/PPP model medical College situated in Jadavpur, Kolkata, West Bengal and affiliated to The West Bengal University of Health Sciences. It is the first private medical College in West Bengal .

History
KPC Medical College and Hospital was the first private-public-partnership (PPP) model medical college of West Bengal. It was founded by Kumud Shankar Ray, in the premises of Dr. K. S. Ray TB Hospital., founded by Dr. K. S. Ray himself.

In January 2002, a memorandum of understanding was signed between the West Bengal state government and a private sector for setting up the college.

Campus

 KPC Medical College and Hospital Building
 K.P.M Ward
 Sarada Building
 N.R.S. and P.C.R. Ward
 Lady Narayani Ward
 New P.W.D.building
 Sukanta Library
KPC Medical College
 Boy's and Girl's separate Hostel

Organisation and administration

Governance
The college and hospital are funded and managed by KPC Charitable Trust and Government of West Bengal.

Departments 
The departments in KPC Medical College are as follows:
    Department of Anesthesiology
    Department of Anatomy
    Department of Biochemistry
    Department of Clinical Dietetics & Community Nutrition
    Department of Community Medicine

    Department of Dentistry
    Department of Dermatology and V&L
    Department of ENT(Ear, Nose and Throat)
    Department of General Medicine
    Department of General Surgery
    Department of Obstetrics & Gynecology
    Department of Ophthalmology
    Department of Orthopaedics
    Department of Paediatrics
    Department of Radiology
    Department of Pulmonary Medicine
    Department of Microbiology
    Department of Pathology
    Department of Pharmacology
    Department of Physiology
    Department of Psychiatry
    Department of Forensic Medicine

Academics

Admission 

Admission to this college is by the National Eligibility cum Entrance Test – UG (NEET-UG) for 50 government quota seats and 77 odd management quota seats, all through central counselling. There is provision for NRI admissions as well for 23 odd seats, with the total strength adding up to 150. The college is affiliated to West Bengal University of Health Sciences of the Government of West Bengal. and recognised by National Medical Commission.

References

External links

 

Medical colleges in India
Affiliates of West Bengal University of Health Sciences
Hospitals in Kolkata
Educational institutions established in 2006
Teaching hospitals in India
2006 establishments in West Bengal